Patratu Super Thermal Power Project is under-construction. It is 4000 MW (800 MW × 5), situated in Patratu, Ramgarh district , Jharkhand. It will use 1500 acres out of 6300 acres available with the existing Patratu Thermal Power Station.

See also
 Jharkhand State Electricity Board

References

External links

Coal-fired power stations in Jharkhand
Proposed power stations in India
Ramgarh district